The Bar Professional Training Course or BPTC is a postgraduate course which allows law graduates to be named and practise as barristers in England and Wales. The eight institutes that run the BPTC along with the four prestigious Inns of Court are often collectively referred to as Bar School. Until September 2010, it was known as the Bar Vocational Course, or BVC.

The BPTC is currently one of the most expensive legal courses in Europe. 

The academic stage is the first of the three stages of legal education; the second is the vocational stage (the BPTC) and the third is the practical stage (pupillage). On successful completion of the BPTC, which also involves completing twelve qualifying sessions, students are called to the Bar; however, only those who have successfully completed pupillage can work as barristers.

Entry requirements
In addition to passing the Bar Course Aptitude Test (BCAT), the minimum entry requirements for the BPTC is qualifying undergraduate degree in law with no less than lower second-class (2:2) honours or a non-law academic degree with lower second-class (2:2) honours alongside the Graduate Diploma in Law.

Criticisms
In April 2015, Chair of the Bar Council Alastair Macdonald raised concerns about the financial risk involved in taking the BPTC, claiming that "There are too many people spending too much money in order to train [. . .] with no realistic prospect of being able to make a start in the profession. In the same month, a report commissioned by the Bar Council heavily criticised BPTC providers. The report suggested that course providers were "using the system to make money from people with no realistic prospect of pupillage," and claimed that the course was "not highly regarded by practitioners." The report suggested increasing standards for the course, and introducing a new test to replace the BCAT, which currently has a 98% pass rate, though there are plans to increase the pass mark. Jeremy Robson, a senior lecturer at Nottingham Law School, denied these claims. He noted that all prospective students receive a health warning noting the low number of pupillages compared to course places, and that the practitioners consulted in the working group were "drawn from a small section of the profession."

Providers

See also 
Law Society of England and Wales
Bar Council
Barrister
Inns of Court
List of areas of law
Bar Standards Board

References

External links
 Table of BPTC providers
  BPTC provider reports
 Chambers Student Guide: What is the BPTC?
 Lawyer 2B: 10 factors to consider when choosing a BPTC provider

Professional certification in law
Law degrees
Bar of England and Wales
Legal profession exams
Legal education in the United Kingdom
Law enforcement in Wales